Baker is a ghost town in Boyd County, Nebraska, United States.

History
A post office was established at Baker in 1891, and remained in operation until it was discontinued in 1906. Baker was likely named for a pioneer settler.

References

Geography of Boyd County, Nebraska